Dongying Shengli Airport  is an airport serving the city of Dongying in Shandong Province, China.  It is located in the town of Yong'an, and was formerly called Dongying Yong'an Airport.  Construction of the airport was started in May 1984 and completed in October 1985.  It was expanded in 2001 and again in 2010.  Flights resumed on 28 February 2011 after the latest expansion was completed, and the airport adopted the new name Dongying Shengli Airport, after the Shengli Oil Field in Dongying.

Facilities
After the 2010 expansion the airport has been upgraded from class 4C to 4D, with a 2,800 meter runway, and a 25,380 square-meter terminal building.  It is projected to handle one million passengers annually by 2020.

Airlines and destinations

See also
List of airports in China
List of the busiest airports in China

References

Airports in Shandong
Airports established in 1985
1985 establishments in China